The East Perth Football Club, nicknamed the Royals, is an Australian rules football club based in Leederville, Western Australia, current playing in the West Australian Football League (WAFL). Formed in 1902 as the Union Football Club, the club entered the WAFL in 1906, changing its name to East Perth. It won its first premiership in 1919, part of a streak of five consecutive premierships. Overall, the club has won 17 premierships, most recently in 2002. The club is currently based at Leederville Oval, which it shares with the Subiaco Football Club, having previously played home games at Wellington Square (from 1901 to 1909) and Perth Oval (formerly known as Loton Park) from 1910 to 1999. The current Director of Coaching is Tony Micale assisting the League Senior Coach of East Perth, Jeremy Barnard.

From 2014 until 2018, East Perth served as the host club for the West Coast Eagles of the Australian Football League, the arrangement saw West Coast's reserves players playing in the WAFL for East Perth.

History
The club was actually founded in 1902 as Union Football Club (not to be confused with the defunct Unions club from Fremantle) and competed in the Perth Third Rate Association Competition (however an earlier ‘East Perth’ had formed in 1891). The club was successful and was promoted to the First Rate Association. After continuing to succeed at this level they applied to join the WAFL and hence became a member in April 1906. The club became known as East Perth in accordance with the WAFL's policy of having each club represent a district in Perth.

After a relatively slow start – despite being competitive form its first season – East Perth after World War I went on to become one of the most powerful clubs in the West Australian league with the appointment of former Subiaco player Phil Matson as captain-coach. The club won five consecutive WAFL premierships between 1919 and 1923, and after a brief lapse due to Matson's death in a truck crash recovered to contest the finals every year from 1931 to 1940, but won only one premiership – a frustrating record to be repeated in the 1970s.

Although the club garnered an undefeated premiership in the under-age WAFL competition in 1944, East Perth became very much a middle-of-the-road side after open-age WANFL football resumed until the emergence of champion ruckman Graham “Polly” Farmer in 1956. That year, despite being held to the lowest WAFL score between 1946 and 2002 by Perth in torrential rain and genuine darkness at the WACA, the Royals won fourteen of their nineteen games and beat South Fremantle twice in the finals. Under the coaching of Jack Sheedy, and aided by becoming the first WAFL club to play players formally, the club contested the following five grand finals for further premierships in 1958 and 1959 and a huge upset loss to Swan Districts in 1961.

The loss of Farmer, however, saw a decline in fortunes: in 1964 the club won only one of its first eighteen games and finished with its first wooden spoon since 1929, but with the recruitment of Kevin Murray the club returned to the top quickly. It returned to the finals in 1966 and played therein during every one of the next seventeen seasons except 1974. During these years East Perth won 246 and drew one of 388 games for a success rate of 63.5 percent: clearly the highest in a competition that – at least during the first half of this period – was extremely even and characterised by very rapid fluctuations in teams’ fortunes. By 1980, the club had made a submission to enter the VFL/AFL, however this was withdrawn, and from 1983 their fortunes declined abruptly: between 1985 and 1995 East Perth won only eighty and draw one of 235 games for a success rate of 34.26%. Indeed, between 1985 and 1989, the Royals actually won just 24 of 105 games for a success rate of 22.8% and did not finish above sixth, with a lowlight being the sacking of coach Greg Brehaut on 13 May 1986 that was followed by a walk-out of three managers from a reserves team that had won five matches out of seven.

In 1996 the Royals returned to prominence and took the minor premiership before losing narrowly to Claremont in its first grand final since 1978. However, the club returned to the lower reaches of the ladder in 1999, winning only five of twenty games. East Perth later acted as the host club for West Coast Eagles players recruited from interstate from 2000 to 2001 until the host club arrangement was abolished. This made them favoured for high honours in 2000 - which was achieved with five Eagles in the grand final side, though the Royals’ “old guard” made a much larger contribution than expected to the club's first flag for twenty-two years. It repeated the dose emphatically in 2001, holding South Fremantle to 0.3 (3) after half time, and yet again in 2002, but fell off steadily in the following four seasons to win only six games in 2005. A partial recovery in 2007 saw the Royals finish fourth, but it returned to last in 2008 before again rebounding in 2009 to finish fifth.

Its first home ground was Wellington Square. It then moved to Perth Oval between 1910 and 2002, although it played games at the WACA from 1988 to 1989. East Perth began playing its games at Leederville Oval from 2000, formerly the home of bitter rivals West Perth), but the club only officially moved there in 2003. They have since been joined at the ground by the Subiaco Football Club.

2010 season
The 2010 season of home and away matches ended on a high for the Royals, as they defeated minor premiers Clarement in a tense and physical round 23 encounter. The win enabled them to hold their fourth place in the top four, earning a first semi-final appearance against East Fremantle.

After a slow start where East Fremantle lead 7.2-3.2 at quarter time East Perth eventually overran the much more fancied Sharks by 14 points 15.12 (102) to East Fremantle 13.10 (88). West Coast Eagles listed player Ben McKinley lead the charge up forward with 6 goals while Zac Beeck and Zac Clarke dominated the ruck.

A week later East Perth met Swan Districts at Bassendean Oval for the chance to meet the top of the table Claremont in the Grand Final. This time it was East Perth who flew out of the blocks to lead at the first change 5.2 to 3.2 but after that they would manage only 4 goals for the rest of the match as Swans steamrolled their way past a valiant East Perth 15.11 (101) to 9.9 (63). Swan Districts then went on to win the 2010 WAFL Premiership defeating Claremont in one of the great Grand Finals by 1 point at Subiaco Oval 8 days later.

The Reserve grade team went one step further than the Seniors in 2010 going down to Claremont by 12 points 13.6 (84) to 10.12 (72) in the Grand Final.

Craig Wulff was finally rewarded with his first FD Book Medal as the Best & Fairest for season 2010.

Current squad
As of Sep 2018:

 1 Will Young
 2 Jackson Ramsay
 3 
 4 Shayne Hille
 5 Patrick McGinnity
 6 Kyle Anderson
 7 Stanley Wright
 8 Will Maginness
 9 Julian Ameduri
 10 Nathan Blee
 11 Ben Miller
 12 Callum Hart
 13 Sharrod Wellingham
 14 Nelson Waite
 15 Lewis Wilson
 16 Mitchell Dobson
 17 Nathan Eaton
 18 Asher Samelko
 19 Aaron Redhead
 20 Ajang Ajang
 21 Rohan Kerr
 22 Tarir Bayok
 23 Tom Gorter
 24 Mathew Johnson
 25 Joel Houghton
 26 Blake Riley
 27 Angus Scott
 28 Jarrhan Jacky
 29 Samuel Bevan
 30 Marcus Ruggiero
 31 Ciaran Allsop
 32 Jamie Rudrum
 33 Edward Simpson
 34 Matthew Young
 35 Harley Stack
 36 Sam East
 37 Jaxon Cahill
 38 Kane La Fontaine
 39 Nathan Arbon
 40 Daniel Russo
 41 Tony Olango
 42 Shaquille McKenzie
 43 Christian Ameduri
 44 Mitchell Gupanis
 45 Campbell Abbott
 46 Kye Willcocks
 47 Jayden Magro
 48 Thomas Amos
 49 Taylor North
 50 Eric Bashemule
 51 Kobe Chrisp
 52 Ben McGuire
 53 Jack Amos
 54 Nathan Dwyer
 55 Steele Milne
 56 Louis Miller
 57 Jacob Msando
 58 Jedd Edwards
 59 
 60 
 61 Mahli King
 62 
 63 
 64 Nicholas Michalczyk
 65 Jack Wheeler
 66 Yugusuk Soka
 67 Egan Bradbury
 68 Kristian Caporn
 69 
 70

Rivalries
East Perth's traditional and most bitter rivals are West Perth Football Club.  Known as the Perth Derby, they have competed in many historic matches including Grand Finals in 1922, 1932, 1960, 1969, 1971, 2002, when East Perth defeated the Falcons by 60 points to complete a hat-trick of premierships, and 2013.

The East Perth vs Perth fixtures were a significant rivalry in the 1960s and 1970s, including the famous 1978 Grand Final. However its significance is somewhat muted compared to the former mentioned fixture, possibly due to Perth's lacklustre performances since the late 1970s.

Another newer rivalry is that with co-tenants Subiaco Football Club. East Perth had not beaten Subiaco since they began sharing the ground in 2004, until the 2007 season when East Perth came from over forty points behind at half time to win the game by three points. Recent games have become even more bitter with the transfer of players Travis Knights, Caine Hayes and Paul Ridley to Subiaco under controversial circumstances. Off the field the two clubs do have a good working relationship in regard to their ground sharing situation.

Club song
East Perth Forever Boys is the theme song of the East Perth Football Club, played as the league team comes to the field at either a home game or final, and after a victory at a home game or final. It is sung to the tune of Anchors Aweigh The lyrics were written by John K. Watts, an ex-player of the club. He was also responsible for the club songs of Swan Districts Football Club and Geelong Football Club. The recording of the song used by the club was performed by Clem Grogan and the Blue Brass. Hobart Football Club also has a song sung to the tune of Anchors Aweigh. Its lyrics are very similar to East Perth Forever Boys.

East Perth forever boys
East Perth are we
East Perth a great tradition
With the premiership our mission
East Perth forever boys
And to the cause
For we are the mighty Royals
East Perth is the greatest team of all

We'll beat the Cardies
Whether it be wet or fine
We'll beat the others
At the bell they'll be behind
No doubt about it
The reason for it

East Perth forever boys
East Perth are we
East Perth a great tradition
With the premiership our mission
East Perth forever boys
And to the cause
For we are the mighty Royals
East Perth is the greatest team of all

Honours

Club honours

Individual honours 
Sandover Medallists: (18 total) 1923: William 'Digger' Thomas, 1925: George 'Staunch' Owens (1925), 1929: Billy Thomas, 1950: Frank Allen, 1956: Graham Farmer, 1957: Graham Farmer, 1958: Ted Kilmurray, 1960: Graham Farmer, 1969: Malcolm Brown, 1975: Alan Quartermaine, 1976: Peter Spencer, 1978: Phil Kelly, 1979: Phil Kelly, 1983: John Ironmonger, 1984: Peter Spencer, 1988: David Bain, 1997: Brady Anderson, 2001: Ryan Turnbull

Simpson Medallists: (7 total) 1958: Ned Bull, 1959: Graham Farmer, 1972: Ken McAullay, 1978: Ian Miller, 2000: Dean Cox, 2001: Ryan Turnbull, 2002: Ryan Turnbull

Bernie Naylor Medallists: (10 total) 1909: Sam Sloss (30), 1924: Bonny Campbell (67), 1926: Bonny Campbell (89), 1927: Bonny Campbell (87), 1944: Alan Watts (101), 1958: William Mose (115), 1959: Neil Hawke (114), 1967: Phil Tierney (119), 1990: Glen Bartlett (69), 2006: Troy Wilson (74), 2013: Josh Smith (62)

All Australians: 1956, 1958 & 1961: Graham Farmer, 1966: Kevin Murray, 1966: Keith Doncon, 1972: Mal Brown, 1972: Ken McAullay, 1979: Barry Cable

Tassie Medallists: (3 total) 1937: Mick Cronin, 1956: Graham Farmer, 1972: Ken McAullay

JJ Leonard Medallists: (1 total) 2014: Brian Dawson

F.D. Book Medallists

The F.D. Book Medal is awarded to the club's fairest and best player at the end of each season.

Records
Highest Score: Round 1, 1944 - 41.30 (276) vs. South Fremantle at Perth Oval

Lowest Score: Round 13, 1909 - 0.6 (6) vs. East Fremantle at Fremantle Oval

Greatest Winning Margin: Round 1, 1944 - 256 points vs. South Fremantle at Perth Oval

Greatest Losing Margin: Round 20, 1987 - 169 points vs. Claremont at WACA

Most Games: Craig Wulff 286 (2002–2016)

Most Goals: Phil Tierney 620 (1962–1972)

Record Home Attendance: Round 9, 1969 - 26,760 vs. West Perth at Perth Oval.

Record Finals Attendance: 1969 Grand Final - 51,385 vs. West Perth at Subiaco Oval.

"Teams of the century"
With the launch of the East Perth history book in mid-2006, an expert panel from the club came up with two "teams of the century", one pre-war team from 1906 to 1944, and the other from 1945 to 2005

Pre-war team

Post-war team

Honourboard

League Championship Cup
In 2010 the Australian Football League (AFL) announced plans to start a knockout competition featuring the best teams from the state leagues around Australia. 16 Teams would qualify based on their finishing position in their corresponding state leagues the previous years. Originally games were played primarily as curtain raisers for AFL games on a Saturday night and broadcast live on Fox Footy. In 2013 the games shifted to Tuesday night and the tournament comprised only 10 teams. The competition is sponsored by Foxtel and is known as Foxtel Cup.

East Perth have qualified for the tournament twice. In the competitions first year, 2011, the Royals defeated North Ballarat and NT Thunder to reach the semi final losing to eventual premiers Williamstown.

The Royals also gained qualification for the 2014 season. East Perth were big 50 point winners over Norwood in the quarter final but once again fell in the semi final to VFL side Williamstown who once again went on to win the title.

F. D. Book Medal
The East Perth Football CLub's senior best and fairest player wins the F. D. Book Medal. Past winners of the award are listed below.

1925 – George Owens
1926 – Larry Duffy 
1927 – Joe "Brum" O'Meara
1928 – Billy Thomas
1929 – Billy Thomas
1930 – Albert Davies
1931 – Mick Cronin
1932 – Herbie Screaigh
1933 – Herbie Screaigh
1934 – Herbie Screaigh
1935 – Brian Ryan
1936 – Leo Graham
1937 – Herbie Screaigh
1938 – Ray Starr
1939 – Dave Miller, Ritchie Thomas
1940 – Ritchie Thomas
1941 – Max O'Loughlin
1945 – Harry Outridge
1946 – Jim Washbourne
1947 – Norm Gibney
1948 – Frank Sparrow
1949 – Ray Perry
1950 – Frank Allen
1951 – Ray Perry
1952 – Frank Sparrow
1953 – Jim Spencer
1954 – Graham Farmer
1955 – Graham Farmer
1956 – Graham Farmer
1957 – Graham Farmer
1958 – Ted Kilmurray
1959 – Graham Farmer
1960 – Graham Farmer
1961 – Graham Farmer
1962 – Don Marinko
1963 – Derek Chadwick 
1964 – Derek Chadwick
1965 – Kevin Murray
1966 – Syd Jackson
1967 – Hans Verstegen
1968 – Jim Haines
1969 – Mal Brown
1970 – Mal Brown
1971 – Ken McAullay
1972 – Mal Brown
1973 – Gary Malarkey
1974 – Ron Alexander
1975 – Peter Spencer 
1976 – Peter Spencer 
1977 – Stephen Curtis
1978 – Kevin Bryant
1979 – Phil Kelly
1980 – Wayne Otway
1981 – Dean Turner
1982 – Stephen Curtis
1983 – Peter Spencer 
1984 – Grant Campbell
1985 – Brett Stephens
1986 – Craig Starcevich
1987 – George Giannakis
1988 – David Bain
1989 – George Giannakis
1990 – Lucio Baroni
1991 – Ryan Turnbull
1992 – Peter Miller
1993 – Ryan Turnbull
1994 – Dean Talbot
1995 – Greg Jones
1996 – Paul Peos
1997 – Peter Miller
1998 – Aaron Marley
1999 – Ryan Turnbull
2000 – David Swan, Aaron Marley, Rod Wheatley
2001 – Rod Wheatley
2002 – Paul Ridley
2003 – Brent Cowell
2004 – Troy Wilson
2005 – Andrew Merrington
2006 – Troy Wilson
2007 – Frank Agostino
2008 – Timothy Noakes
2009 – Trevor Oliver
2010 – Craig Wulff
2011 – Brendan Lee
2012 – Paul Johnson
2013 – Brendan Lee

See also
Wikipedia listing of East Perth Football Club players
Ugly Men's Association

Notes
During the years 1942 to 1944 the WAFL operated as an under age competitionfrom 1925from 1957fourth grade competition ran from 1965 to 1974

References

External links

 
 East Perth stats and facts -  at WAFLFootyFacts
 Full Points Footy – Detailed club history

 
Australian rules football clubs in Western Australia
Australian rules football clubs established in 1902
West Australian Football League clubs
Proposed VFL/AFL clubs
1902 establishments in Australia
East Perth, Western Australia